The 2019–20 Coupe de France preliminary rounds, Occitanie was the qualifying competition to decide which teams from the leagues of the Occitanie region of France took part in the main competition from the seventh round.

A total of eleven teams qualified from the Occitanie preliminary rounds. In 2018–19, FC Sète 34 progressed furthest in the main competition, reaching the round of 32 before losing to Lille OSC.

Schedule
The first two rounds of the qualifying competition took place on the weekends of 25 August and 1 September 2019. A total of 460 teams were involved in the first two rounds, with 104 teams awarded byes to round two. Both the first and second rounds were arranged entirely within each district of the region.

The third round draw was made on 4 September 2019. The 11 Championnat National 3 (tier 5) sides entered at this stage.

The fourth round draw was made on 19 September 2019. The two sides from Championnat National 2 (tier 4) entered at this stage, and 39 ties were drawn.

The fifth round draw was made on 3 October 2019. The single side from Championnat National (tier 3) entered at this stage, and 20 ties were drawn.

The sixth round draw was made on 17 October 2019. Ten ties were drawn.

First round
These matches are from the Ariège district, and were played on 23, 24 and 25 August 2019.

These matches are from the Aude district, and were played on 23, 24 and 25 August 2019.

These matches are from the Aveyron district, and were played on 23, 24 and 25 August 2019.

These matches are from the Gard-Lozère district, and were played on 23, 24 and 25 August 2019.

These matches are from the Haute-Garonne district, and were played on 23, 24, 25 and 28 August 2019.

These matches are from the Gers district and were played on 23, 24 and 25 August 2019.

These matches are from the Hérault district, and were played on 23, 24 and 25 August 2019.

These matches are from the Lot district, and were played on 23, 24 and 25 August 2019.

These matches are from the Hautes-Pyrénées district, and were played on 23, 24 and 25 August 2019.

These matches are from the Pyrénées-Orientales district, and were played on 23, 24 and 25 August 2019.

These matches are from the Tarn district, and were played on 23, 24 and 25 August 2019.

These matches are from the Tarn-et-Garonne district, and were played on 23, 24, 25 and 28 August 2019.

Second round
These matches are from the Ariège district, and were played on 30 and 31 August 2019 and 1 September 2019.

These matches are from the Aude district, and were played on 30 and 31 August 2019 and 1 September 2019.

These matches are from the Aveyron district, and were played on 30 and 31 August 2019 and 1 September 2019.

These matches are from the Gard-Lozère district, and were played on 30 and 31 August 2019 and 1 September 2019.

These matches are from the Haute-Garonne district, and were played on 30 and 31 August 2019 and 1 September 2019.

These matches are from the Gers district, and were played on 30 and 31 August 2019 and 1 September 2019.

These matches are from the Hérault district, and were played on 30 and 31 August 2019 and 1 September 2019.

These matches are from the Lot district, and were played on 30 and 31 August 2019 and 1 September 2019.

These matches are from the Hautes-Pyrénées district, and were played on 30 and 31 August 2019 and 1 September 2019.

These matches are from the Pyrénées-Orientales district, and were played on 30 and 31 August 2019 and 1 September 2019.

These matches are from the Tarn district, and were played on 30 and 31 August 2019 and 1 September 2019.

These matches are from the Tarn-et-Garonne district, and were played on 30 and 31 August 2019 and 1 September 2019.

Third round
These matches were played between 13 and 15 September 2019.

Fourth round
These matches were played on 28 and 29 September 2019.

Fifth round
These matches were played on 12 and 13 October 2019, with one postponed to 23 October 2019.

Sixth round
These matches were played on 26 and 27 October 2019.

References

Preliminary rounds